
Gmina Osjaków is a rural gmina (administrative district) in Wieluń County, Łódź Voivodeship, in central Poland.

Villages
Gmina Osjaków contains the villages and settlements of Borki Walkowskie, Chorzyna, Czernice, Dębina, Dolina Czernicka, Drobnice, Felinów, Gabrielów, Jasień, Józefina, Kolonia Raducka, Krzętle, Kuźnica Ługowska, Kuźnica Strobińska, Nowa Wieś, Osjaków, Raducki Folwark, Raduczyce, Walków and Zofia.

Neighbouring gminas
Gmina Osjaków is bordered by the gminas of Kiełczygłów, Konopnica, Ostrówek, Rusiec, Siemkowice, Wieluń and Wierzchlas.

References
Polish official population figures 2006
The former Jewish Community of Osjaków/Shakev

External links
Osjakow.info - website and forum of Osjakow

Osjakow
Wieluń County